Baculentulus is a genus of proturans in the family Acerentomidae.

Species
These 39 species belong to the genus Baculentulus:

 Baculentulus africanus (Nosek, 1976)
 Baculentulus becki (Tuxen, 1976)
 Baculentulus bisetuli Yin, 1985
 Baculentulus borealis Nakamura, 2004
 Baculentulus breviunguis (Condé, 1961)
 Baculentulus celisi (Condé, 1955)
 Baculentulus changchunensis Wu & Yin, 2008
 Baculentulus chiangmaiensis
 Baculentulus densus (Imadaté, 1960)
 Baculentulus duongkeoi (Imadaté, 1965)
 Baculentulus evansi (Condé, 1961)
 Baculentulus hohuanshanensis Chao, Lee & Chen, 1998
 Baculentulus krabbensis Bu, Potapov & Yin, 2014
 Baculentulus kulsarinae
 Baculentulus lanna (Imadaté, 1965)
 Baculentulus leptos Yin, 1985
 Baculentulus loxoglenus Yin, 1980
 Baculentulus macqueeni (Bernard, 1976)
 Baculentulus matsuokai (Imadaté, 1965)
 Baculentulus morikawai (Imadaté & Yosii, 1956)
 Baculentulus nipponicus Nakamura, 1985
 Baculentulus nitidus (Imadaté & Yosii, 1959)
 Baculentulus numatai (Imadaté, 1965)
 Baculentulus nyinabitabuensis (Condé, 1961)
 Baculentulus ogawai (Imadaté, 1965)
 Baculentulus oginoi (Imadaté, 1965)
 Baculentulus potapovi Shrubovych, 2010
 Baculentulus pseudonitidus (Tuxen & Imadaté, 1975)
 Baculentulus sakayorii Nakamura, 1995
 Baculentulus samchonri (Imadaté & Szeptycki, 1976)
 Baculentulus seychellensis Tuxen, 1978
 Baculentulus taipeiensis Chao, Lee & Chen, 1998
 Baculentulus tienmushanensis (Yin, 1963)
 Baculentulus tosanus (Imadaté & Yosii, 1959)
 Baculentulus tuxeni (Nosek & Hüther, 1974)
 Baculentulus umesaoi (Imadaté, 1965)
 Baculentulus weinerae Szeptycki & Imadaté, 1987
 Baculentulus yodai (Imadaté, 1965)
 Baculentulus yunnanensis Yin, 1985

References

Protura